Sacred Planet is a 2004 documentary film directed by Jon Long and Hairul Salleh Askor. Robert Redford provided narration for the film. The film was released by Walt Disney Pictures on April 22, 2004, and grossed $1,108,356.

Cast
 Arapata McKay
 Tsaan Ciqae
 Mae Tui
 Cy Peck Jr.
 Mutang Urud

References

External links
 

2004 films
2004 documentary films
American documentary films
Disney documentary films
Environmental films
Walt Disney Pictures films
2000s English-language films
2000s American films